The Monitor–Merrimac Memorial Bridge–Tunnel (MMMBT) is the 4.6 mile-long (7.4 km) Hampton Roads crossing for Interstate 664 in the southeastern portion of Virginia in the United States. It is a four-lane bridge–tunnel composed of bridges, trestles, man-made islands, and tunnels under a portion of the Hampton Roads harbor where the mouths of the James, Nansemond, and Elizabeth Rivers come together.

It connects the independent cities of Newport News on the Virginia Peninsula and Suffolk in South Hampton Roads and is part of the Hampton Roads Beltway, a circumferential interstate highway which links the seven largest cities of Hampton Roads.

The MMMBT, completed in 1992 provided a third major vehicle crossing of the Hampton Roads harbor area, supplementing the Hampton Roads Bridge–Tunnel which carries Interstate 64 between the independent cities of Hampton and Norfolk, and the James River Bridge connecting the independent city of Newport News and Isle of Wight County in the South Hampton Roads region. All three facilities are toll-free.

The MMMBT cost $400 million to build, and it includes a four-lane tunnel that is 4,800 feet (1,463 m) long, two man-made portal islands, and 3.2 miles (5.1 km) of twin trestle.

Battle of Hampton Roads

The MMMBT is named for the two ironclad warships which engaged in the famous Battle of Hampton Roads on March 8–9, 1862, during the US Civil War. The battle took place between the USS Monitor and the CSS Virginia. The latter ship had been rebuilt from the wreck of the USS Merrimack. The site of the battle was within 1 mile (1.6 km) of the bridge–tunnel structure named by the Commonwealth of Virginia as a memorial.

See also
 List of bridges
 Lists of tunnels
 List of bridge–tunnels

References
 Rand McNally "The Road Atlas", 2005.

External links
 Roads to the Future website
 Kurumi's website about 3 digit interstates connecting with I-64
 Virginia Dept. of Transportation: Hampton Roads Tunnels and Bridges
 Snopes.com discussion about photo
 Google Maps

Bridges completed in 1992
Road tunnels in Virginia
Bridge–tunnels in North America
Buildings and structures in Newport News, Virginia
Transportation in Newport News, Virginia
Transportation in Suffolk, Virginia
Buildings and structures in Suffolk, Virginia
Monuments and memorials in Virginia
Tunnels completed in 1992
Road bridges in Virginia
Immersed tube tunnels in the United States
Crossings of the James River (Virginia)
Trestle bridges in the United States
Bridges on the Interstate Highway System